State Route 196 (SR 196) is a  route that serves as a connection between SR 52 and SR 27 through Geneva.

Route description
The western terminus of SR 196 is located at its intersection with SR 52 in western Geneva. From this point, the route travels in a southeasterly direction en route to its eastern terminus at SR 27. The route is also signed as West Magnolia Avenue for its duration.

Major intersections

References

External links

196
Transportation in Geneva County, Alabama